Prathipadu Assembly constituency is a constituency in Kakinada district of Andhra Pradesh, representing the state legislative assembly in India. It is one of the seven assembly segments of Kakinada (Lok Sabha constituency), along with Pithapuram, Tuni, Peddapuram, Kirlampudi, Kakinada, and Kakinada. Sri Purnachandra Prasad Parvatha is the present MLA of the constituency, who won the 2019 Andhra Pradesh Legislative Assembly election from YSR Congress Party. , there are a total of 202,743 electors in the constituency.

Mandals 

The four mandals that form the assembly constituency are:

Members of Legislative Assembly Prathipadu

Election results

Assembly Elections 1955

Assembly Elections 1962

Assembly Elections 1967

Assembly Elections 1972

Assembly Elections 1983

Assembly Elections 1985

Assembly Elections 1989

Assembly Elections 1994

Assembly Elections 1999

Assembly Elections 2004

Assembly Elections 2009

Assembly elections 2014

Assembly elections 2019 

 

2019 election data :

YSRCP
7657446. 77% Sri Purnachandra Prasad Parvatha

TDP
7190843. 92% Varupula Raja

JSP
69074. 22% Varupula Tammayyababu

INC
33542. 05% Ummidi Venkatrao

NOTA
20731. 27% Nota

BJP
11930. 73% Chilukuri Ram Kumar

CPI(ML)(L)
5670. 35% Manukonda Latchababu

MDPP
5290. 32% Dadisetty Veerababu

IND
3350. 20% B.V.V. Satyanarayana Gorla

PSHP
2740. 17% Parvatha Prasad

References 

Assembly constituencies of Andhra Pradesh